is a railway station located in the city of Semboku, Akita Prefecture, Japan, operated by JR East.

Lines
Jindai Station is served by the Tazawako Line, and is located 52.8 km from the terminus of the line at Morioka Station. The route of the Akita Shinkansen passes through this station.

Station layout
The station has two opposed side platforms connected by a level crossing. The station is unattended.

Platforms

History
Jindai Station opened on December 11, 1921 as a station on the Obonai keiben-sen, serving the village of Jindai, Akita. The line was nationalized the following year, becoming part of the Japanese Government Railway (JGR) network, which became the Japan National Railways (JNR) after World War II. The station was absorbed into the JR East network upon the privatization of the JNR on April 1, 1987. A new station building was completed in March 1997.

Surrounding area

See also
 List of Railway Stations in Japan

External links

 JR East Station information 

Railway stations in Japan opened in 1921
Railway stations in Akita Prefecture
Tazawako Line
Semboku, Akita